Hagor is a moshav in the Central District of Israel. Located between Rosh HaAyin and Kfar saba it falls under the jurisdiction of Drom HaSharon Regional Council.

History
Moshav Hagor was founded in 1949 by veterans of the Palmach's Ninth Battalion. It became a cooperative agricultural settlement populated by new immigrants, mostly from Middle Eastern and North African countries. The name comes from a verse in the Book of Psalms, "Gird (in Hebrew, hagor) thy sword upon thy thigh, O mighty one, Thy glory and thy majesty" (Psalms 45:3). 

The children of Hagor attend the elementary school at Tzofit, a nearby moshav. Their middle school is located near moshav Neve Yerek, and the secondary school is in Beit Berl.

Notable residents
Gabi Ashkenazi, former Chief of Staff of the Israel Defense Forces
Dan Halutz, former Chief of Staff of the Israel Defense Forces

References

Moshavim
Populated places in Central District (Israel)
Populated places established in 1949
1949 establishments in Israel